In computability theory two sets  of natural numbers are computably isomorphic or recursively isomorphic if there exists a total bijective computable function  with . By the Myhill isomorphism theorem, the relation of computable isomorphism coincides with the relation of mutual one-one reducibility.

Computably isomorphic numberings induce the same notion of computability on a set.

References 

.

Reduction (complexity)